The Climber is a 1975 Italian crime drama film written and directed  by Pasquale Squitieri and starring Joe Dallesandro.

Cast
 Joe Dallesandro as Aldo, The Climber
 Stefania Casini as Luciana
 Raymond Pellegrin as Don Enrico
 Benito Artesi as Ciriaco
 Ferdinando Murolo as Carlo
 Tony Askin as Man On Train
 Giovanni Cianfriglia as Gianni
 Lorenzo Piani as Bernard

Release
The Climber was released in Italy on 18 February 1975, where it was distributed by Titanus.  The film grossed a total of 638,368,060 Italian lire.

References

External links

Italian crime drama films
1975 crime drama films
1975 films
Films directed by Pasquale Squitieri
Titanus films
1970s Italian films